The following is a list of notable deaths in December 2012.

Entries for each day are listed alphabetically by surname. A typical entry lists information in the following sequence:
Name, age, country of citizenship and reason for notability, established cause of death, reference.

December 2012

1
Raymond Ausloos, 82, Belgian football player.
Jovan Belcher, 25, American football player (Kansas City Chiefs), suicide by gunshot.
José Bénazéraf, 90, French film director and producer.
Arthur Chaskalson, 81, South African judge, Chief Justice (2001–2005), leukaemia.
Mitchell Cole, 27, English footballer (Southend United, Stevenage Borough), complications of a heart defect.
John Crigler, 76, American basketball player (University of Kentucky).
Steve Fox, 54, English footballer, cancer.
Chuck Gavin, 78, American football player.
Dee Harvey, 47, American R&B singer.
Rick Majerus, 64, American college basketball coach (University of Utah, Saint Louis University), heart failure.
Ezroy Millwood, 70, Jamaican transport businessman.
Gerard Parker, 76, American Cherokee tribal leader, Principal Chief of the Eastern Band of Cherokee Indians (1995).
Rubén Pellanda, 65, Argentine politician.
Ed Price, 94, American politician, member of the Florida Senate (1958–1966).
Ray Rosso, 96, Italian-born American football coach, natural causes.
Marcia Russell, 72, New Zealand journalist and news presenter.
Edouard Saouma, 86, Lebanese civil servant, Director General of the Food and Agriculture Organization (1976–1993).
Bhim Bahadur Tamang, 78, Nepali politician, stroke.
Phil Taylor, 95, English footballer and coach (Liverpool).
Vidal Vega, 48, Paraguayan peasant leader, shooting.
Yoshinori Watanabe, 71, Japanese yakuza, fifth godfather of the Yamaguchi-gumi.
Reinhold Weege, 62, American television writer and producer (Barney Miller, Night Court), natural causes.
James R. Whelan, 79, American publisher (The Washington Times), multiple organ failure.
Karl-Heinz Wiebe, 96, German U-boat chief engineer during World War II and Iron Cross recipient.

2
Ron Auchettl, 66, Australian footballer.
Michael Crawford, 92, English cricketer.
Preeti Ganguly, 59, Indian actress, cardiac arrest.
Michael A. Gorman, 62, American politician, member of the North Carolina House of Representatives (2003–2005), POEMS syndrome.
Tom Hendry, 83, Canadian playwright, founder of Manitoba Theatre Centre.
Hiroshi Kato, 77, Japanese aikido master.
Israel Keyes, 34, American alleged serial killer, suicide by hanging and lacerations.
Ehsan Naraghi, 86, Iranian sociologist and writer, Director of UNESCO's Youth Division (1980–1996), long illness.
Sylvester Odhiambo, Kenyan football coach (Muhoroni Youth F.C.).
Décio Pignatari, 85, Brazilian poet, essayist and translator, respiratory failure.
Azumir Veríssimo, 77, Brazilian footballer.
Szymon, 23, Australian musician, suicide.

3
Jules Mikhael Al-Jamil, 74, Iraqi-born Lebanese Syrian Catholic hierarch, Archbishop-Procurator in Rome (since 1986).
Leo Rajendram Antony, 85, Sri Lankan Roman Catholic prelate, Bishop of Trincomalee-Batticaloa (1974–1983).
Tommy Berggren, 62, Swedish footballer.
Ivan Boboshko, 83, Soviet football player and coach.
Georgy Borisenko, 90, Soviet correspondence chess grandmaster and chess theoretician.
Kuntal Chandra, 28, Bangladeshi cricketer, strangulation.
Bill Donckers, 61, American football player, lymphoma.
Christopher Erhardt, 53, American video game producer and academic.
Peter Johnson, Sr., 91, American trial lawyer and political power broker, pulmonary fibrosis.
Fyodor Khitruk, 95, Russian animator and animation director (The Story of a Crime).
Mohamed Mahroof, 62, Sri Lankan politician, MP for Colombo (2000–2010).
Diego Mendieta, 32, Paraguayan footballer, viral infection.
Carlomagno Meneses, 85, Peruvian Olympic boxer.
Eileen Moran, 60, American visual effects producer (The Lord of the Rings, Avatar, King Kong), cancer.
King G. Porter, 91, American politician, member of the Tennessee State Senate.
Sir Geoffrey Shakerley, 80, British photographer.
Janet Shaw, 46, Australian Paralympic bronze medal-winning (2004) cyclist and author, cancer.
Jeroen Willems, 50, Dutch actor and singer, cardiac arrest.

4
Alfredo Abon Lee, 85, Cuban military officer.
Narmada Akka, Indian communist, shot.
Grady Allen, 66, American football player (Atlanta Falcons), cardiac arrest.
José Alves da Costa, 73, Brazilian Roman Catholic prelate, Bishop of Corumbá (1991–1999).
Vasily Belov, 80, Russian writer, poet and dramatist.
Philippe Bena, 60, French Olympic fencer.
Jean Bollack, 89, French philosopher, philologist and literary critic.
Jack Brooks, 89, American politician, member of US House of Representatives (1953–1995) and Texas House of Representatives (1949–1953).
Miguel Calero, 41, Colombian footballer, cerebral thrombosis.
Rozina Cambos, 60, Israeli actress (The Human Resources Manager), leukemia.
James B. Cardwell, 90, American bureaucrat, complications of a broken hip.
Besse Cooper, 116, American supercentenarian, world's oldest person.
Anthony Deane-Drummond, 95, British army major general.
Massimo Giustetti, 86, Italian Roman Catholic prelate, Bishop of Pinerolo (1974–1975), Mondovi (1975–1986) and Biella (1986–2001).
Jonathan Harvey, 73, English composer, motor neurone disease.
Helen Johnson Houghton, 102, British racehorse trainer.
Eamon Kelly, 65, Irish criminal, shot.
Peter Kiesewetter, 67, German modern classical composer.
Miroslav Klůc, 90, Czech Olympic ice hockey (1956) forward and coach, member of Czech Ice Hockey Hall of Fame, stroke.
Larry Lawrence, 63, American football player (Oakland Raiders, Tampa Bay Buccaneers, Edmonton Eskimos), edema.
Paul Marcotte, 84, American politician, member of the Kentucky House of Representatives (2005–2007).
Branislav Milinković, 52, Serbian diplomat, ambassador to NATO and Austria, suicide by jumping.
Robert Monclar, 82, French Olympic basketball player.
Hilmar Moore, 92, American politician, longest-serving mayor in the United States, complications of a fall.
Tony Sweeney, 81, Irish sports writer and historian, heart attack.
Michael Till, 77, British Anglican priest, Dean of Winchester (1996–2005).
Ken Trickey, 79, American basketball coach (Oral Roberts University).
Gerrit van Dijk, 73, Dutch animator, long illness.
John Ward, 64, American football player (Minnesota Vikings), cancer.

5
Allah Bachayo Khoso, 77, Pakistani artist and Alghoza player.
Sammy Arena, 81, American singer, multiple organ failure.
Petrine Archer-Straw, 55, British art historian, sickle-cell disease.
Erwin Bischofberger, 76, Swedish Jesuit and medical practitioner.
Dave Brubeck, 91, American jazz pianist ("Take Five") and composer ("Blue Rondo à la Turk"), heart failure.
MC Buffalo, 41, Croatian rapper, stroke.
Carlos Francisco Chang Marín, 90, Panamanian painter, musician, journalist, and writer.
Evgeny Chubarov, 77, Russian painter, sculptor, and graphic artist.
Chen Wencong, 42, Singaporean actor, writer and producer, pneumonia.
Eduardo J. Corso, 92, Uruguayan journalist and lawyer.
Wilhelmus Demarteau, 95, Dutch-born Indonesian Roman Catholic prelate, Bishop of Banjarmasin (1954–1983).
Enebeli Elebuwa, 66, Nigerian actor, stroke.
Peter Feltus, 70, American philatelist.
Francesco Fonti, 64, Italian criminal.
Kazbek Gekkiyev, 28, Russian journalist, shooting.
Frigyes Hollósi, 71, Hungarian actor.
Ignatius IV of Antioch, 92, Syrian Orthodox patriarch of the Greek Orthodox Church of Antioch (since 1979), stroke.
Nakamura Kanzaburō XVIII, 57, Japanese kabuki star, acute respiratory distress syndrome.
Dame Elisabeth Murdoch, 103, Australian philanthropist, widow of Sir Keith Murdoch, mother of Rupert Murdoch.
Yves Niaré, 35, French Olympic (2008) shot putter, traffic collision.
Oscar Niemeyer, 104, Brazilian architect, respiratory infection.
Eileen Pollock, 86, American television writer and producer (Dynasty, The Colbys).
Kaisa Sere, 58, Finnish computer scientist.
Doug Smith, 75, Scottish footballer and administrator (Dundee United).
Felix Weinberg, 84, Czech-born British physicist.

6
Miguel Abia Biteo Boricó, 51, Equatorial Guinean politician, Prime Minister (2004–2006), heart attack.
Mike Boyette, 71, American professional wrestler, heart disease.
Jan Carew, 92, Guyanese writer and academic.
Ed Cassidy, 89, American musician (Spirit), cancer.
Eta Cohen, 96, English violin teacher and author.
Arnold C. Cooper, 79, American academic.
Bim Diederich, 90, Luxembourgian road bicycle racer.
David Favrholdt, 81, Danish philosopher.
Keitani Graham, 32, Micronesian Olympic (2012) Greco-Roman wrestler, heart attack.
Alice Harden, 64, American politician, Mississippi State Senator (since 1988).
Karine Kazinian, 57, Armenian diplomat, Ambassador to the United Kingdom (since 2011), complications during surgery.
Jeffrey Koo Sr., 79, Taiwanese businessman and billionaire, chairman for Chinatrust Financial Holding Company.
Huw Lloyd-Langton, 61, British guitarist (Hawkwind, Widowmaker), throat cancer.
Reginald Norby, 78, Norwegian diplomat, Ambassador to France (1994–1998).
O-Six, 6, Yellowstone National Park gray wolf, shot.
Pulpit, 18, American Thoroughbred racehorse, winner of the 1997 Fountain of Youth Stakes and Blue Grass Stakes.
Giovanni Sostero, 48, Italian astronomer, heart attack.
Pedro Vaz, 49, Uruguayan diplomat and lawyer, Minister of Foreign Affairs (2009–2010), Ambassador to Chile (since 2010), heart attack.

7
Abu-Zaid al Kuwaiti, 46, Kuwaiti al-Qaeda leader, drone strike.
Duggan Anderson, 88, Australian football player (Swan Districts Football Club).
Olga Beaver, 70, Czech-American mathematician.
Marie Bennigsen-Broxup, 68, British orientalist.
Mikelis Brizga, 101, Australian businessman.
P. J. Carey, 59, American baseball coach (Colorado Rockies).
Chen Wen-yu, 88, Taiwanese horticulturist.
Thomas Cornell, 75, American artist and professor, cancer.
Armando Costa, 63, Canadian soccer coach and player.
Gilbert Durand, 91, French academic.
Ernest England, 85, Australian cricketer.
Ammar El Sherei, 64, Egyptian musical composer and performer, heart ailment.
Denis Houf, 80, Belgian footballer (Standard Liège).
William F. House, 89, American physician, developer of the cochlear implant, cancer.
Irene Hughes, 92, American psychic.
Nikola Ilić, 27, Serbian basketball player, cancer.
Armand Van De Kerkhove, 97, Belgian footballer 
Roelof Kruisinga, 90, Dutch politician, Minister of Defence (1977–1978).
Art Larsen, 87, American tennis player.
Jeni Le Gon, 96, American dancer and actress (Amos 'n' Andy).
Rusty Mills, 49, American animator (Animaniacs, Pinky and the Brain, The Replacements), colon cancer.
Ralph Parr, 88, American fighter pilot, Korean War flying ace.
Marty Reisman, 82, American table tennis player, complications of heart and lung ailments.
Saul Steinberg, 73, American businessman and corporate raider.
Govindasamy Suppiah, 83, Singaporean football referee, diabetes.
Joseph R. Weisberger, 92, American judge, Chief Justice of Rhode Island Supreme Court (1993–2001).

8
Hermelindo Alberti, 87, Argentine sprinter.
Barry Altman, 63, American businessman, cancer.
Jerry Brown, 25, American football player (Dallas Cowboys), traffic collision.
Mary Griggs Burke, 96, American art collector, largest private collector of Japanese art outside Japan.
Arnold Dean, 82, American radio sports host and personality.
Vernice Ferguson, 84, American nurse and healthcare executive.
John Gowans, 78, British religious leader and musician, General of The Salvation Army (1999–2002).
Jagannathan, 74, Indian actor.
Yvonne Kennedy, 67, American politician, member of the Alabama House of Representatives (since 1979).
Johnny Lira, 61, American lightweight boxer, liver disease.
Ambrose Madtha, 57, Indian Roman Catholic prelate, Titular Archbishop of Naissus, Apostolic Nuncio to Côte d'Ivoire (since 2008), traffic collision.
Charles Martin, 81, American politician, member of the Alabama House of Representatives and Alabama Senate.
Khan Sarwar Murshid, 88, Bangladeshi educationist and intellectual, complications from stroke.
Walter Newman, 91, American civic leader and army veteran.
Bill Prest, 86, Australian politician, Queensland MLA for Port Curtis (1976–1992).
Hal Schaefer, 87, American jazz musician and vocal coach (Marilyn Monroe) involved in the Wrong-Door Raid.
Isaiah Shavitt, 87, Polish–born American theoretical chemist.
Mark Strizic, 84, Australian photographer.

9
Jenni Rivera, 43, American-born Mexican banda and norteño singer, plane crash.
Barbara Alby, 66, American politician, member of the California State Assembly (1993–1998).
Håkon E. Andersen, 87, Norwegian bishop.
Mathews Mar Barnabas, 88, Indian Metropolitan of Malankara Orthodox Syrian Church.
Michael Bürsch, 70, German politician.
Anna Czóbel, 94, Hungarian cinematographer.
Biswajit Das, 24, Bangladeshi tailor, murdered.
Jeanne Gervais, 90, Ivorian politician.
Anat Gov, 58, Israeli playwright and screenwriter, colorectal cancer.
Hiromori Kawashima, 90, Japanese sports administrator.
Ivan Ljavinec, 89, Ukrainian-born Czech Byzantine Catholic hierarch, Apostolic Exarch in the Czech Republic (1996–2003).
Sir Patrick Moore, 89, British astronomer and broadcaster (The Sky at Night), infection.
Alex Moulton, 92, British engineer and inventor (Moulton Bicycle).
Béla Nagy Abodi, 94, Hungarian painter.
André Nelis, 77, Belgian Olympic silver (1956) and bronze (1960) medal-winning sailor, cancer.
Ataa Oko, c. 93, Ghanaian fantasy coffin artist.
Charles Rosen, 85, American pianist and author, cancer.
Riccardo Schicchi, 59, Italian pornographer, chronic kidney disease caused by type 2 diabetes.
Norman Joseph Woodland, 91, American inventor, co-creator of the bar code.

10
Iajuddin Ahmed, 81, Bangladeshi politician, President (2002–2009), heart and kidney disease.
Vladimir Bakulin, 73, Kazakhstani Olympic silver medal-winning (1968) wrestler.
Ashwini Bhatt, 76, Indian novelist.
Cliff Brown, 60, American football player (Notre Dame).
Antonio Cubillo, 82, Spanish politician, founder of Canary Islands Independence Movement.
Lisa Della Casa, 93, Swiss soprano.
Marla English, 77, American actress.
Ralph Frese, 86, American canoe maker and conservationist.
Ed Grady, 89, American actor (The Notebook, Dawson's Creek).
Albert O. Hirschman, 97, German-born American economist.
Hungargunn Bear It'n Mind, 9,  Hungarian Vizsla, the Best in Show at Crufts in 2010.
Harry Iauko, Vanuatuan politician, MP for Tanna (2008–2012), complications of pneumonia.
Ibn Bey, 28, British-bred Thoroughbred racehorse and sire.
Jacques Jullien, 83, French Roman Catholic prelate, Bishop of Beauvais (1978–1984), and Archbishop of Rennes (1985–1998).
Patricia Kennedy, 96, Australian stage, film, and television actress (My Brilliant Career, Return to Eden).
Ciarán Maher, 50, Irish Gaelic football player.
Roy Miles, 77, British art dealer.
Bob Munden, 70, American entertainer, heart failure.
Shoichi Ozawa, 83, Japanese actor and folk art researcher.
Paul Rauch, 82, American television producer (Another World, One Life to Live, Santa Barbara), complications of blood clots.
Tommy Roberts, 70, British fashion designer.
John Small, 66, American football player (Atlanta Falcons, Detroit Lions).
Felix Stehling, 87, American restaurateur, co-founder of Taco Cabana, dementia.
Erwin Tomash, 91, American businessman (Dataproducts), Alzheimer's disease.
Birdsall S. Viault, 80, American academic.
Reginald James Wallace, 93, British civil servant, last Governor of the Gilbert Islands (1978–1979).

11
Emilia Pisani Belserene, 89, American astronomer.
Toni Blankenheim, 90, German opera singer.
Lou Castagnola, 76, American athlete.
Genadiy Dulnev, 85, Russian academic.
Semiha Es, 100, Turkish photographer.
Antonie Hegerlíková, 89, Czech actress, Thalia Award winner (2004).
William B. Hopkins, 90, American politician, member of Virginia Senate (1960–1980), majority leader (1976–1980).
Pedro Reginaldo Lira, 97, Argentinian Roman Catholic prelate, Bishop of San Francisco in Argentina (1961–1965), and Auxiliary Bishop of Salta (1967–1978).
B. B. Nimbalkar, 92, Indian cricketer.
Dindi Gowa Nyasulu, 68, Malawian politician, leader of AFORD, brain tumor.
Manuel Pardo, 56, American serial killer, execution by lethal injection.
Gérard Rasquin, 85, Luxembourgian Olympic sprinter.
Alois Schnaubelt, 91, German Nazi soldier, awarded Knight's Cross of the Iron Cross (1944).
Ravi Shankar, 92, Indian musician, complications from heart surgery.
Walter Francis Sullivan, 84, American Roman Catholic prelate, Bishop of Richmond (1974–2003), liver cancer.
Galina Vishnevskaya, 86, Russian soprano opera singer and recitalist.
Colleen Walker, 56, American golfer, won du Maurier Classic (1997), breast cancer.
Mendel Weinbach, 79, Polish-born Israeli rabbi.

12
Joe Allbritton, 87, American businessman, broadcaster and publisher.
Fazlul Haque Amini, 67, Bangladeshi Muslim scholar.
W. Rex Black, 92, American politician, member of the Utah Senate (1973–1997).
Cynthia Bolbach, 64, American lawyer, cancer.
Ray Briem, 82, American radio host (KABC), cancer.
Eddie "Guitar" Burns, 84, American Detroit blues musician, heart failure.
Manas Chakraborty, 70, Indian singer.
Ron Cooper, 80, British bicycle frame maker.
Alfred Delcourt, 83, Belgian football referee.
Richard Eyre, 83, British Anglican priest, Dean of Exeter (1981–1996).
Chris Fokma, 85, Dutch sculptor and ceramist.
Laurie Gallagher, 88, Australian footballer.
Else Marie Jakobsen, 85, Norwegian textile artist.
Walt Kirk, 88, American basketball player (Fort Wayne Pistons, Milwaukee Hawks).
Don Medford, 95, American television director (Baretta, Dynasty, The F.B.I., The Fugitive).
N.M. Mohan, 63, Indian comic book writer and editor, heart attack.
Thomas Naylor, 76, American economist.
Uri Possen, 70, American economist.
Manju Bharat Ram, 66, Indian educationalist, cancer.
Augustin Sagna, 92, Senegalese Roman Catholic prelate, Bishop of Ziguinchor (1966–1995).
Nityanand Swami, 85, Indian politician, Chief Minister of Uttarakhand (2000–2001).
David Tait, 25, English rugby player, suspected suicide by fall from a building.

13
Willie Ackerman, 73, American drummer (Willie Nelson, Loretta Lynn, Louis Armstrong).
Andreu Alfaro, 83, Spanish sculptor.
Donnie Andrews, 58, American criminal, inspiration for Omar Little on The Wire, complications of heart surgery.
Balthazar Bigirimana, Burundian politician and diplomat.
Ian Black, 88, Scottish footballer.
Jan Blaha, 74, Czech Roman Catholic prelate, Bishop (1967–2012).
John Bradley, 87, American racer.
Alan Colquhoun, 91, English architect, historian, critic and teacher.
Gil Friesen, 75, American music and film executive, President of A&M Records (1965–1990), leukemia.
Jack Hanlon, 96, American child actor (Our Gang, The Shakedown, The General).
Maurice Herzog, 93, French climber and politician, Minister of Youth and Sport (1958–1963).
Natalya Kustinskaya, 74, Russian actress (Three Plus Two, Ivan Vasilievich Changes Profession), complications from pneumonia.
Moshe Lazar, 84, American academic.
Newton Edward Miller, 93, American politician, member of the New Jersey House of Representatives (1981–1989).
Midori Miura, 64, Japanese translator of Russian, cancer.
T. Shanmugham, 92, Indian footballer and coach, respiratory ailment.
Rob Talbot, 89, New Zealand politician, MP for Ashburton (1966–1969, 1978–1987) and South Canterbury (1969–1978).
Abdesslam Yassine, 84, Moroccan political figure, complications of influenza.

14
Joseph Abiodun Adetiloye, 82, Nigerian Anglican prelate, Primate of the Church of Nigeria (1986–1999).
Leon Abrams, 89, British surgeon.
Claude Abravanel, 88, Swiss pianist and composer.
Richard Baum, 72, American China watcher.
Avrelija Cencič, 48, Slovenian university professor.
Alida Chelli, 69, Italian actress, cancer.
Ertuğ Ergin, 42, Turkish singer.
John Graham, 89, British army major general.
Edward Jones, 62, American politician, North Carolina State Senator (since 2007), pancreatic cancer.
Kenneth Kendall, 88, British television broadcaster (BBC News, Treasure Hunt), complications of a stroke.
Klaus Köste, 69, German Olympic champion (1972) gymnast, heart failure.
Hazel McIsaac, 79, Canadian politician, Newfoundland and Labrador House of Assembly member for St. George's (1975–1982), Alzheimer's disease.
Jitka Senecká, 72, Czech Olympic volleyball player.
Marion Stokes, 83, American television producer and civil rights activist.
Shōmei Tōmatsu, 82, Japanese photographer.
Sandy Hook Elementary School shooting victims:
Charlotte Bacon, 6, American student, shot.
Daniel Barden, 7, American student, shot.
Rachel D'Avino, 29, American behavior therapist, shot.
Olivia Engel, 6, American student, shot.
Josephine Gay, 7, American student, shot.
Victoria Leigh Soto, 27, American elementary school teacher, shot.

15
Mohammad Amin, 84, Indian historian.
Yury Anisimov, 74, Soviet Olympic sailor.
Owoye Andrew Azazi, 60, Nigerian general, National Security Adviser (2010–2012), helicopter crash.
Jamala al-Baidhani, 35, Yemeni activist, respiratory disease.
Dick Hafer, 85, American jazz saxophonist.
Bob Johnston, 83, Australian rules footballer (Melbourne).
C. Louis Kincannon, 72, American bureaucrat, Director of the U.S. Census Bureau (2002–2008), cancer.
Vincent Lafko, 67, Slovak Olympic silver medallist handball player (1972).
Bob Odell, 90, American football player, kidney disease.
Páidí Ó Sé, 57, Irish Gaelic football player and manager, suspected heart attack.
Bobby Jack Oliver, 76, American football player.
Ralph Pampena, 78, American police officer, Pittsburgh Police Chief (1987–1990), cancer.
Jeffrey Potter, 94, American author.
John Anderson Strong, 97, Scottish physician and academic.
Takeshi Urata, 65, Japanese astronomer.
Patrick Ibrahim Yakowa, 64, Nigerian politician, Governor of Kaduna State (since 2010), helicopter crash.
Olga Zubarry, 83, Argentine film actress.

16
Charlesia Alexis, 78, Chagossian singer and activist.
Axel Anderson, 83, German-born Puerto Rican actor.
Robert W. Bazley, 87, American four-star general.
James Walker Benét, 98, American journalist, veteran of the Abraham Lincoln Brigade, son of William Rose Benét.
Petar Bozhilov, 49, Bulgarian canoer.
Sheila Casey (née McKinley), 71, Scottish singer, cancer.
John Chen Shi-zhong, 94, Chinese Roman Catholic prelate, Bishop of Suifu (since 1985).
Peter Clarke, 77, British cartoonist.
Doyle Conner, 83, American politician, member of Florida House (1950–1960), Speaker (1958–1960), Florida Commissioner of Agriculture (1961–1991).
Febo Conti, 85, Italian television and radio presenter.
Duaine Counsell, 92, American football and baseball coach.
Robert Derleth, 90, American football player, complications of a stroke.
Andrzej Dłużniewski, 73, Polish sculptor.
George Duggan, 100, New Zealand Marist priest and writer.
Elwood V. Jensen, 92, American medical researcher, pneumonia.
Laurier LaPierre, 83, Canadian broadcaster and politician, Senator from Ontario (2001–2004).
Iñaki Lejarreta, 29, Spanish Olympic (2008) mountain biker, traffic collision.
Avraham Mor, 77, Israeli actor and voice actor, cancer.
Adam Ndlovu, 42, Zimbabwean footballer, traffic collision.
Enrique Oltuski, 82, Cuban politician and revolutionary, respiratory failure.
Nikolai Parshin, 83, Russian football player and manager.
Jim Patterson, 84, Scottish footballer.
Brian Sampson, 71, Australian rules football player.
Fan Vavřincová, 95, Czech author and screenwriter (Eva tropí hlouposti, Taková normální rodinka).
Josh Weston, 39, American gay porn actor, AIDS-related causes.
Jake Adam York, 40, American poet, stroke.

17
Charlie Adam, 50, Scottish footballer, suicide.
Richard Adams, 65, Filipino-born American gay rights activist, cancer.
Tony Charlton, 83, Australian sports broadcaster, bowel cancer.
Chinwe Chukwuogo-Roy, 60, Nigerian-born British artist, cancer.
Wayne Ducheneaux, 76, American Native leader.
Manfred Feist, 82, German politician and party functionary.
Jack Frazer, 80, Canadian politician.
James Gower, 90, American Catholic priest and peace activist, co-founder of the College of the Atlantic.
Jesse Hill, 86, American civil rights leader and businessman.
Daniel Inouye, 88, American politician, Senator from Hawaii (since 1963), President pro tempore (since 2010), Medal of Honor recipient, respiratory failure.
Peter Kenen, 80, American academic, emphysema.
Arnaldo Mesa, 45, Cuban Olympic silver medal-winning (1996) boxer, stroke.
Frank Pastore, 55, American baseball player (Cincinnati Reds), injuries from a traffic collision.
Midge Richardson, 82, American magazine editor (Seventeen), natural causes.
Sir Colin Spedding, 87, British biologist and agricultural scientist.
Carroll S. Walsh, Jr., 91, American judge, New York Supreme Court (1978–1990), heart failure.

18
Skippy Baxter, 93, American figure skater.
Leman Çıdamlı, 80, Turkish actress, lung cancer.
Gabrielle Clerk, 89, Canadian psychologist.
Spencer Cox, 44, American HIV/AIDS activist, AIDS-related causes.
Kari Danielsen, 77, Norwegian speed skater.
Joseph T. Doyle, 81, American judge and politician, cancer.
Sigmund Eisner, 92, American academic.
Albert Elias, 41, American sports agent.
Georgi Kaloyanchev, 87, Bulgarian actor (The Tied Up Balloon, Where Are You Going?).
Koko, 7, Australian canine actor (Red Dog), heart disease.
Ben Luján, 77, American politician, member of the New Mexico House of Representatives (since 1975), Speaker (since 2001), lung cancer.
Frank Macchiarola, 71, American educator, New York City Schools Chancellor (1978–1983), liver cancer.
Bessie Moody-Lawrence, 71, American politician, member of the South Carolina House of Representatives (1993–2007), brain cancer.
Mustafa Ould Salek, 76, Mauritanian army officer and politician, Chairman of the Military Committee for National Recovery (1978–1979).
Keith Reilly, 77, Canadian curler.
Camil Samson, 77, Canadian politician, MNA for Rouyn-Noranda (1970–1981).
George Showell, 78, English footballer, ruptured stomach aortic artery.
Danny Steinmann, 70, American film director (Friday the 13th: A New Beginning).
Jim Whalen, 69, American football player (New England Patriots).
Kevin Williams, 42, American football player.
Sir Marcus Worsley, 5th Baronet, 87, English politician, MP for Keighley (1959–1964) and Chelsea (1966–1974).
Muriel T. Yacavone, 92, American politician, member of the Connecticut House of Representatives (1970–1982).

19
Bud Alper, 82, American sound engineer (Blade Runner, Rocky, The Crow).
Inez Andrews, 83, American gospel singer (The Caravans), cancer.
Mauricio García Araujo, 81, Venezuelan economist.
Sir Lawrie Barratt, 85, English businessman (Barratt Developments).
Robert Bork, 85, American legal scholar, jurist, and 1987 Supreme Court nominee, heart disease.
Alan Cowey, 77, British biochemist.
Paul Crauchet, 92, French actor.
Ian Crewes, 74, Australian footballer.
Garniss Curtis, 93, American geophysicist.
Colin Davis, 79, British racing driver, winner of 1964 Targa Florio.
Les Devonshire, 86, English footballer.
Pecker Dunne, 79, Irish musician.
Krzysztof Etmanowicz, 53, Polish football manager.
Daniel Gasman, 79, American historian.
Konrad Hischier, 77, Swiss Olympic skier.
Georges Jobé, 51, Belgian motocross rider, five-time FIM World Motocross Champion, leukemia.
Douglas Leiterman, 85, Canadian producer and journalist (This Hour Has Seven Days).
Amnon Lipkin-Shahak, 68, Israeli lieutenant general, Chief of Staff (1995–1998) and politician, Minister of Transportation and Tourism, cancer.
Larry Morris, 79, American football player (Chicago Bears, Los Angeles Rams), after long illness.
Keiji Nakazawa, 73, Japanese manga artist and writer (Barefoot Gen), lung cancer.
George O'Donnell, 83, American baseball player (Pittsburgh Pirates).
Virginia Starcher, 82, American politician, member of the West Virginia House of Delegates (1986–1990).
Peter Struck, 69, German politician, member of the Bundestag (1980–2009), Minister of Defence (2002–2005), heart attack.
Piet de Visser, 81, Dutch politician.

20
George Almones, 50, American basketball player, heart failure.
Mohammad Awad, 73, Jordanian footballer.
Bill Bell, 100, British army officer and lawyer.
Don Campbell, 87, Canadian ice hockey player.
Daniel Cazés, 73, Mexican anthropologist.
Stan Charlton, 83, English footballer (Leyton Orient, Arsenal).
Leslie Claudius, 85, Indian Olympic champion (1948, 1952, 1956, 1960) field hockey player, cirrhosis of the liver.
Richard Crandall, 64, American scientist, leukemia.
Niall FitzGerald, 81, Irish football player.
Robert Juniper, 83, Australian artist.
Eagle Keys, 89, American-born Canadian CFL football player (Montreal Alouettes, Edmonton Eskimos) and coach (Saskatchewan Roughriders).
Larry L. King, 83, American writer and playwright (Best Little Whorehouse in Texas), emphysema.
Chick Maggioli, 90, American football player.
Jimmy McCracklin, 91, American blues musician, diabetes and hypertension.
Victor Merzhanov, 93, Russian classical pianist.
Erich Peters, 92, Swedish Olympic gymnast.
Albert Renaud, 92, Canadian ice hockey player.
Thelma Reston, 75, Brazilian actress (Entranced Earth), breast cancer.
Kamil Sönmez, 65, Turkish singer and actor, State Artist, cerebral hemorrhage.
Dennis Stevens, 79, English footballer (Bolton Wanderers, Everton).
Jerome Whitehead, 56, American basketball player, gastrointestinal hemorrhage.

21
Sultan Ahmed, 74, Bangladeshi Navy admiral.
Vivian Anderson, 91, American baseball player (Milwaukee Chicks).
Boyd Bartley, 92, American baseball player (Brooklyn Dodgers).
Jarl Borssén, 75, Swedish actor and comedian.
Thomas Bryant, 79, South African cricketer.
Margarita Costa Tenorio, 61, Spanish biologist.
Curtis Crider, 82, American racing driver.
Jishu Dasgupta, 53, Indian film and television producer, cardiac arrest.
Lee Dorman, 70, American bass guitarist (Iron Butterfly, Captain Beyond), natural causes.
David Lomon, 94, British military veteran, member of the International Brigade.
Shane McEntee, 56, Irish politician, TD for Meath (2005–2007) & Meath East (since 2007); Minister of State at the Department of Agriculture, Food and the Marine (since 2011), suicide.
Thomas W. McGee, 88, American politician, member of the Massachusetts House of Representatives (1963–1991) and Speaker (1975–1984).
Lotoala Metia, Tuvaluan politician, Minister for Finance, after long illness.
Seiso Moyo, 56, Zimbabwean politician, MP for Nketa, heart attack.
Daphne Oxenford, 93, English television and radio actress (Listen with Mother, Coronation Street).
Basil Robinson, 93, English-born Canadian cricketer.

22
Peter Anker, 85, Norwegian art historian and critic.
Bashir Ahmad Bilour, 69, Pakistani politician, bombing.
Paul Borowski, 75, German Olympic silver medallist sailor (1972).
Chuck Cherundolo, 96, American football player (Philadelphia Eagles, Pittsburgh Steelers), heart failure.
Charles Cleveland, 61, American basketball player.
Wattie Dick, 85, Scottish footballer (Accrington Stanley).
Neil Doolan, 79, Australian football player.
Ryan Freel, 36, American baseball player (Cincinnati Reds), suicide by gunshot.
Emidio Greco, 74, Italian film director and screenwriter.
Willy Blok Hanson, 98, Javanese-born Canadian dancer.
Rip Hawk, 82, American professional wrestler.
George Hazlett, 89, Scottish footballer.
Gary Johnson, 74, American baseball player and manager.
Květa Legátová, 93, Czech writer, novel filmed as Želary.
Barbara Lett-Simmons, 85, American politician.
*Lim Keng Yaik, 73, Malaysian politician.
Bill McBride, 67, American politician, Democratic Party nominee for Governor of Florida (2002), heart attack.
Gerald Melling, 69, British-born New Zealand architect and writer.
Cliff Osmond, 75, American actor (Irma la Douce, The Fortune Cookie, Kiss Me, Stupid), pancreatic cancer.
Robert Pew, 89, American businessman and philanthropist, CEO and Chairman of Steelcase.
Bolesław Proch, 60, Polish speedway rider, heart attack.
Arthur Quinlan, 92, Irish journalist (The Irish Times).
Robert Stevenson, 96, American musicologist.
Arkady Vorobyov, 88, Soviet weightlifter, Olympic champion under-90 kg (1956, 1960).
Marva Whitney, 68, American singer, complications of pneumonia.

23
Jerry Araos, 68, Filipino sculptor, landscape artist, and activist.
Eduardo Arnosi, 88, Argentine music critic and writer.
Emilio Ciolli, 79, Italian cyclist.
Abe Deutschendorf, 77, American politician, member of the Oklahoma House of Representatives (1994–2006).
Dennis Greenland, 75, British soil scientist.
Jean Harris, 89, American convicted murderer, killer of Scarsdale Diet doctor Herman Tarnower.
Sylvia Hyman, 95, American ceramic artist.
Eduardo Maiorino, 33, Brazilian MMA fighter, heart attack.
Judy Nerat, 64, American politician, member of the Michigan House of Representatives (2009–2011), cancer.
John Quimby, 77, American politician, member of the California State Assembly (1962–1974), complications of pneumonia.
Mike Scaccia, 47, American heavy metal guitarist (Ministry, Rigor Mortis, Revolting Cocks), heart attack.
Pedro Toledo, 69, Puerto Rican public official, Superintendent of the Puerto Rico Police Department (1993–2001, 2005–2009), cardiac arrest.
Cristian Tudor, 30, Romanian footballer, cirrhosis.
Klemens von Klemperer, 96, German-born American historian.
Evelyn Ward, 89, American television actress, mother of David Cassidy, Alzheimer's disease.

24
Anand Abhyankar, 48, Indian actor, traffic collision.
Hugh Aitken, 88, American composer.
Vilen Barskyi, 92, Ukrainian Soviet and German artist.
Richard Rodney Bennett, 76, English composer (Nicholas and Alexandra, Murder on the Orient Express).
Frank Christian, 60, American singer-songwriter.
Ray Collins, 76, American singer (The Mothers of Invention), cardiac arrest.
Brad Corbett, 75, American baseball owner (Texas Rangers, 1974–1980).
Guy Dodson, 75, New Zealand biochemist.
Charles Durning, 89, American actor (Evening Shade, Rescue Me, Dog Day Afternoon), natural causes.
Kimio Eto, 88, Japanese musician.
Earl Evans, 57, American basketball player.
Carolina Griño-Aquino, 89, Filipino judge, Supreme Court (1988–1993) and Court of Appeals.
Douglas Hamilton, 65, British journalist, drowned.
Lee Hartman, 82, American animator (The Mickey Mouse Club, Sleeping Beauty), dementia.
Jack Klugman, 90, American actor (Quincy, M.E., The Odd Couple, 12 Angry Men), Emmy winner (1964, 1971, 1973), prostate cancer.
Alexander Leaf, 92, American physician and research scientist.
Xavier Mabille, 79, Belgian historian and political scientist.
Dennis O'Driscoll, 58, Irish poet.
Elwyn Richardson, 87, New Zealand educator.
Capital STEEZ, 19, American rapper.

25
Sita bint Fahd Al Damir, 90, Saudi royal.
Erico Aumentado, 72, Filipino politician, member of the House of Representatives for Bohol (since 2010), pneumonia.
Jerzy Bereś, 82, Polish artist.
Sir Neville Bosworth, 94, British politician, Lord Mayor of Birmingham (1969–1970).
Augusto Bracca, 94, Venezuelan songwriter, respiratory arrest.
Frank Calabrese, Sr., 75, American mafia hitman (Family Secrets), suspected heart disease.
*Rachel Douglas-Home, 27th Baroness Dacre, 83, British aristocrat.
Jane Dixon, 75, American Episcopal prelate, Suffragan Bishop of Washington (1992–2002).
Peter Ebert, 94, German opera director.
Şerafettin Elçi, 74, Kurdish lawyer, politician, government minister and statesman, cancer.
Halfdan Hegtun, 94, Norwegian radio personality and politician.
Edward Hughes, 92, American Roman Catholic prelate, Bishop of Metuchen (1987–1997), cancer.
John Josephs, 88, English cricketer (Leicestershire).
Henry Ford Kamel, 51, Ghanaian politician, MP for Buem (since 2004).
Joe Krivak, 77, American football coach (University of Maryland), leukemia.
Mahmoud Larnaout, 67, Tunisian actor.
Rudolf Müller, 81, German Roman Catholic prelate, Bishop of Görlitz (1994–2006).
Othmar Schneider, 84, Austrian Olympic champion (1952) Alpine skier and marksman.
Turki bin Sultan, 53, Saudi royal, Deputy Minister of Culture and Information (since 2011), heart attack.
Lynn Watters, 96, Canadian Olympic sailor.
Jože Zidar, 85, Slovenian Olympic ski jumper.

26
Abdul Ghafoor Ahmed, 85, Pakistani politician and educator.
Gerry Anderson, 83, British producer, writer and director (Thunderbirds, Captain Scarlet and the Mysterons), Alzheimer's disease.
Fontella Bass, 72, American singer ("Rescue Me"), complications from a heart attack.
Paul T. Bateman, 93, American number theorist.
Elizabeth Brewster, 90, Canadian poet and academic.
Chu Ting-shun, 84, Taiwanese folk musician and yueqin player.
Les Garnider, 89, Australian footballer.
Anton Geiser, 88, Yugoslav-born Nazi concentration camp guard.
E. Porter Hatcher Jr., 76, American politician, member of the Kentucky House of Representatives (1987–1999).
Hugh Lambie, 95, Australian Olympic rower.
Gerald McDermott, 71, American filmmaker and author.
Jean Perrot, 92, French archaeologist.
Irving Saraf, 80, Polish producer, editor and director (In the Shadow of the Stars, One Flew Over the Cuckoo's Nest), amyotrophic lateral sclerosis.
Henri Strzelecki, 87, Polish-born British fashion designer, co-founder of Henri Lloyd.
Ibrahim Tannous, 83, Lebanese military commander.
Rebecca Tarbotton, 39, Canadian-born American environmental activist, director of Rainforest Action Network, drowning.

27
Zuleika Alambert, 90, Brazilian writer, feminist, and politician.
Peter Anderson, 62, New Zealand cricketer.
Bernie Baxter, 83, Australian rules football player.
Valentin Boreyko, 79, Russian Olympic champion (1960) rower.
Harry Carey Jr., 91, American actor (Gremlins, Tombstone, The Searchers), natural causes.
Lloyd Charmers, 74, Jamaican singer and record producer, heart attack.
Mahmudul Karim Chowdhury, Bangladeshi politician.
Beatriz da Costa, 38, German artist, cancer.
Maurice Paul Delorme, 93, French Roman Catholic prelate, Auxiliary Bishop of Lyon (1975–1994).
Beth Finch, 91, American politician, first female Mayor of Fayetteville, North Carolina (1975–1981).
Hamid Ghodse, 74, Iranian-born British academic, expert in substance abuse and dependence, lung cancer.
Sohrab Hossain, 90, Bangladeshi singer, exponent of Nazrul Sangeet.
Ken Jones, 68, English footballer (Bradford Park Avenue, Southampton).
Paul Khoarai, 79, Mosotho Roman Catholic prelate, Bishop of Leribe (1970–2009).
Jorma Kortelainen, 80, Finnish Olympic silver medalist (1956) cross-country skier and rower, sepsis.
Tingye Li, 81, Chinese-born American physicist.
Edgar May, 83, Swiss-born American politician and Pulitzer prize-winning (1961) journalist, member of Vermont House of Representatives (1973–1983) and Senate (1983–1991), stroke.
Benny McLaughlin, 84, American footballer.
Jesco von Puttkamer, 79, German-born American aerospace engineer and NASA manager.
Albert Riederer, 67, American judge and civic leader, Missouri Court of Appeals (1997–1999), cancer.
Archie Roy, 88, Scottish astronomer and paranormal expert, pneumonia.
Jim Sandoval, 54, American baseball historian.
Norman Schwarzkopf, Jr., 78, American general, Commander-in-Chief of United States Central Command (1988–1991), complications from pneumonia.
Noriko Sengoku, 90, Japanese actress (Seven Samurai).
Takashi Taniguchi, 65, Japanese voice actor.
Mlađa Veselinović, 97, Serbian actor.
Salt Walther, 65, American racecar driver.
Ivar Ytreland, 86, Norwegian politician.

28
Nicholas Ambraseys, 83, Greek engineering seismologist.
Fyodor Arkhipenko, 91, Soviet-Belorussian pilot.
Bogdan Baltazar, 73, Romanian banker, press secretary for Prime Minister Petre Roman, cancer.
Martin G. Barnes, 64, American politician, first African American mayor of Paterson, New Jersey (1997–2002).
Richard Lee Beasley, 82, American politician, member of the South Carolina House of Representatives (1960–1966), father of David M. Beasley.
Steve Bryles, 55, American politician, member of the Arkansas Senate (2001–2011), cancer.
John Carol Case, 89, British baritone.
Emilio Charles, Jr., 56, Mexican professional wrestler, kidney failure.
Jayne Cortez, 76, American poet and performance artist.
Mark Crispin, 56, American computer programmer.
John Diehl, 76, American football player.
Václav Drobný, 32, Czech footballer (Aston Villa, national team), bobsleigh collision.
Barrie Edgar, 93, English producer (Come Dancing, Gardeners' World), pneumonia.
Jon Finch, 70, English actor (Frenzy, Kingdom of Heaven).
Arnór Hannibalsson, 78, Icelandic philosopher and professor.
Frank Henderson, 84, American politician and judge, member of the South Dakota Senate (1965–1966, 1969–1970) and Supreme Court of South Dakota (1979–1994).
Tommy Keane, 44, Irish association football player.
Leif Krantz, 80, Swedish television producer and film director.
Dan Kraus, 89, American basketball player and FBI special agent, cancer.
Claude-Anne Lopez, 92, American author and scholar, Alzheimer's disease.
Lord Avie, 34, American thoroughbred racehorse, oldest living Eclipse Award winner (1980).
Arman Manukyan, 81, Turkish economist and writer, heart disease.
George Patterson, 92, Scottish missionary.
Fred Rehm, 91, American basketball player.
Emmanuel Scheffer, 88, German-born Israeli football coach, coached national team to only World Cup (1970).
Burdette Solum, 85, American politician, member of the South Dakota House of Representatives (1991–1992, 1998–2004).
Frankie Walsh, 76, Irish hurler (Waterford GAA).

29
Hugh Adam, 87, Scottish businessperson.
Aleksandra Akimova, 90, Russian pilot.
Bob Astles, 88, British-born Ugandan government adviser of Milton Obote and Idi Amin.
Mike Auldridge, 73, American bluegrass musician (The Seldom Scene), cancer.
Kevin Betson, 83, Australian footballer.
Henri Bortoft, 74, British philosopher.
Chu Chang-kyun, 91, South Korean businessperson.
Keith Crombie, 73, British music venue owner and promoter.
Tony Greig, 66, South African cricketer, England captain (1975–1977) and Australian Nine Network television commentator, heart attack.
Roland Griffiths-Marsh, 89, Australian soldier.
Patience Latting, 94, American politician, first female Mayor of Oklahoma City (1971–1983).
Edward Meneeley, 85, American artist.
Ian Norton, 75, English cricketer.
Ben Overton, 86, American judge, Supreme Court of Florida (1974–1999), complications following heart surgery.
William Rees-Mogg, Baron Rees-Mogg, 84, British journalist and life peer, Editor of The Times (1967–1981), oesophageal cancer.
Salvador Reyes Monteón, 76, Mexican footballer (C.D. Guadalajara, national team).
Paulo Rocha, 77, Portuguese film director.
Bruce Stark, 79, American cartoonist (New York Daily News), emphysema.
Ruth Ann Steinhagen, 83, American stalker, shot Eddie Waitkus, inspiration for The Natural, fall.
Ignacy Tokarczuk, 94, Polish Roman Catholic prelate, Archbishop of Przemyśl (1965–1993).
Jean Topart, 90, French actor (Fantastic Planet).
Jeanne Vertefeuille, 80,  American CIA official.

30
Maulana Bijligar, 85, Pakistani religious leader.
Gerry Brady, 87, Irish sports shooter.
Catarina Castor, 32, Guatemalan politician, first Ixil woman elected to Congress, plane crash.
Philip Coppens, 41, American author, cancer.
Dennis Ferguson, 64, Australian convicted child sex offender.
Beate Sirota Gordon, 89, Austrian-born American performing arts producer and women's rights advocate, drafted the Constitution of Japan.
Mike Hopkins, 53, New Zealand sound editor (The Lord of the Rings: The Two Towers, Transformers), drowning.
Arend Langenberg, 63, Dutch voice-over and radio presenter, rectal cancer.
Rita Levi-Montalcini, 103, Italian neurologist and senator for life, Nobel laureate in Physiology or Medicine (1986), natural causes.
Göran Nilsson, 66, Swedish cinematographer.
Gloria Pall, 85, American actress, heart failure.
Sir Irvine Patnick, 83, British politician, MP for Sheffield Hallam (1987–1997), heart disease.
Sonam Topgyal, 71, Tibetan politician, Kalön Tripa (Prime Minister) of the Central Tibetan Administration (1997–2001), stomach cancer.
Andreu Vivo, 34, Spanish artistic gymnast, competed at the 2000 Summer Olympics, heart attack while mountain climbing.
Carl Woese, 84, American biologist, winner of Leeuwenhoek Medal (1992), National Medal of Science (2000), complications from pancreatic cancer.

31
Elfriede Abbe, 93, American sculptor, wood engraver and botanical illustrator.
Larry Bowie, 73, American football player (Minnesota Vikings).
Moisès Broggi, 104, Spanish physician and pacifist.
Carmen Calleja, 63, Spanish politician.
Sergio de Castro, 90, French-Argentinian artist.
Béla Csécsei, 60, Hungarian politician, Mayor of Józsefváros (1993–2009).
Susana Dalmás, 64, Uruguayan politician, Senator (2010–2012), heart attack.
Jim Davenport, 54, American journalist (Associated Press), cancer.
Walter Hekster, 75, Dutch composer, clarinetist and conductor.
Konstantin Kobets, 73, Russian Soviet-era military commander.
Alasdair Liddell, 63, British health executive.
Velta Līne, 89, Latvian actress, Stalin Prize (1948, 1951), People's Artist (1973).
Annapurna Maharana, 95, Indian revolutionary figure and women's rights activist.
Jovette Marchessault, 74, Canadian writer and artist.
Tarak Mekki, 54, Tunisian politician, heart attack.
Alan Reece, 85, British engineer and businessman.
James B. Reuter, 96, American-born Filipino Roman Catholic priest and mass media advocate, complications from a stroke.
Jean-Henri Roger, 63, French film director.
Günter Rössler, 86, German photographer.
Yang Teng-kuei, 74, Taiwanese film producer (Fong Sai-yuk, A City of Sadness), stroke.

References

2012-12
 12